Gmina Czarna may refer to any of the following rural administrative districts in Subcarpathian Voivodeship, Poland:
Gmina Czarna, Bieszczady County
Gmina Czarna, Dębica County
Gmina Czarna, Łańcut County